Al Nasr Sporting Club, sometimes Al Naser Sporting Club, is a Kuwaiti professional football club, founded on 8 June 1965, and based in Ardiyah. The team has participated in the Kuwait Premier League 26 times. Al Nasr had been promoted to the Premier League three times, as champions of Kuwaiti Division One.

Players

Current squad

Managerial history

Honours
Kuwaiti Division One
Winners (3): 1977–78, 1986–87, 2006–07
Kuwaiti Federation Cup
Winners (1): 2021–22

Asian record
 AFC Cup: 1 appearance
2011: Group Stage

 GCC Champions League: 2 appearances
2012: Quarter-finals
2012: Group stage

References

External links
 

Football clubs in Kuwait
Association football clubs established in 1965
1965 establishments in Kuwait
Sports teams in Kuwait